This is a list of events from British radio in 1953.

Events
6 January – The Broadcasting Council for Wales meets for the first time.
2 June – The Coronation of Queen Elizabeth II is broadcast on the BBC Home Service and the BBC Light Programme, with seven hours of coverage provided.
12 November – Writers Frank Muir and Denis Norden introduce the dysfunctional family of The Glums into comedy series Take It from Here and they become the most popular segment of the show.
Late 1953 – Lesley Saweard joins the cast of BBC serial The Archers to take over the part of Christine Barford which she plays until 2019, making her the world's longest-serving soap opera actor in any medium.

Programme debuts
2 May – Variety Playhouse on the BBC Home Service (1953–1962)
29 July – A Life Of Bliss on the BBC Home Service (1953–1969)

Continuing radio programmes

1930s
 In Town Tonight (1933–1960)

1940s
 Music While You Work (1940–1967)
 Sunday Half Hour (1940–2018)
 Desert Island Discs (1942–Present)
 Family Favourites (1945–1980)
 Down Your Way (1946–1992)
 Have A Go (1946–1967)
 Housewives' Choice (1946–1967)
 Letter from America (1946–2004)
 Woman's Hour (1946–Present)
 Twenty Questions (1947–1976)
 Any Questions? (1948–Present)
 Mrs Dale's Diary (1948–1969)
 Take It from Here (1948–1960)
 Billy Cotton Band Show (1949–1968)
 A Book at Bedtime (1949–Present)
 Ray's a Laugh (1949–1961)

1950s
 The Archers (1950–Present)
 Educating Archie (1950–1960)
 Listen with Mother (1950–1982)
 The Goon Show (1951–1960)

Births
2 January – Iain Pattinson, comedy writer (d. 2021)
6 January – Paul Mayhew-Archer, comedy writer and producer
22 February – Geoffrey Perkins, comedy producer (d. 2008)
21 April – Jim Lee, radio continuity announcer and newsreader
26 October – Roger Allam, actor
David Owen Norris, classical pianist, composer, academic and broadcaster

Deaths
9 April – C. E. M. Joad, philosopher and broadcaster (b. 1891)
30 September – Robert Mawdesley, stage and radio actor (b. c.1900)
9 November – Dylan Thomas, Welsh poet and radio broadcaster (b. 1914)

See also 
 1953 in British music
 1953 in British television
 1953 in the United Kingdom
 List of British films of 1953

References 

 
Years in British radio
Radio